Zhiryatino is the name of several rural localities in Russia:
Zhiryatino, Bryansk Oblast, a selo in Zhiryatinsky Selsoviet of Zhiryatinsky District of Bryansk Oblast
Zhiryatino, Ivanovo Oblast, a village in Vichugsky District of Ivanovo Oblast
Zhiryatino, Kostroma Oblast, a village in Sudislavskoye Settlement of Sudislavsky District of Kostroma Oblast
Zhiryatino, Oryol Oblast, a village in Krasnikovsky Selsoviet of Kromskoy District of Oryol Oblast